Woody (formerly, Weringdale) is an unincorporated community in Kern County, California, in the United States.

History

Woody was named after Sparrell Walter Woody, who homesteaded with his wife at the foot of Blue Mountain in 1862. The Woody School District was founded in 1873 and a post office opened in 1889. Copper was discovered near Woody in 1891 by Joseph Weringer, who founded the Greenback Mine and built the nine-room Weringdale Hotel. Quartz gold was found on Blue Mountain in 1894, and the population of the town, then known as Weringdale, grew to over a hundred. By the time the townsite was subdivided by Weringer in 1909, the community's name had reverted to Woody.

A small ranch town, the total population of Woody has changed little since the mid-1890s. The post office, fire department, and Blue Mountain Graveyard are situated on the outskirts of town. There is also an elementary school and a community hall where the Woody residents have gatherings and events. There used to be a restaurant/ bar in Woody, but financial problems caused it to close.

A local legend states that the outlaw Joaquin Murrieta once had a cave/hideout in the area that he used while on the run.

California Historical Landmark

Just outside of Woody is California Historical Landmark number 589, the Mountain House Station signed May 22, 1957. The spot was a Butterfield Overland Mail Stagecoach stop and station from 1858 to 1861. The location of the Mountain House Station was on Dry Creek, on Bakersfield-Glenville Roads about 6.3 miles from Woody.

Mountain House Station California Historical Landmark reads:
NO. 589 MOUNTAIN HOUSE - One and one-half miles north of this point stood the Mountain House Station on the route of the Butterfield Stage. Operating through present Kern County during 1858-1861, this famous line ran from St. Louis, Missouri to San Francisco until the outbreak of the Civil War.

See also
Glennville Adobe a California Historical Landmark in Woody
California Historical Landmarks in Kern County
California Historical Landmark

References

Unincorporated communities in Kern County, California
Populated places established in 1889
Unincorporated communities in California